Pervomaiscoe is a commune in Drochia District, Moldova. It is composed of two villages, Pervomaiscoe (formerly Căetănești) and Sergheuca (formerly Serghiești). At the 2004 census, the commune had 897 inhabitants.

References

Communes of Drochia District